Jim Giles (1939–December 20, 2006) was a longtime television meteorologist with CBS affiliate KOTV, Channel 6 in Tulsa, Oklahoma.  A "longtime fixture" on Oklahoma television, after his death the Tulsa World described him as  "perhaps the best-known weatherman in this area".

Career
Giles began his career in 1961. Upon graduation from Ball State University, he was commissioned as an officer in the United States Air Force. While in the Air Force, he served as the commander of the Nha Trang weather station in Vietnam during the Vietnam War and spent three years at the  Severe Storms Forecast Center in Kansas City, Missouri. It was during those years that development began on Doppler weather radar. He taught meteorology and worked in broadcasting in Austin and Dallas before joining KOTV in 1981 as chief meteorologist.

Giles' Coats for Kids
Since 1986, Giles spearheaded the Giles' Coats For Kids Campaign, which provided warm winter coats for Oklahomans who would otherwise do without.  As of his retirement over 200,000 coats had been donated.

Retirement and death
On November 22, 2006, Giles retired from KOTV after 25 years. In his final interview, Giles said he wanted to be remembered for "just doing a good job."  After his retirement, Giles began a business venture selling steel safe rooms of his own design as storm shelters for the tornado-prone Tulsa area, but a few weeks later, on December 20, 2006, he died after battling a series of health problems.

Legacy

In the days following his death, local news stations across northeastern Oklahoma paid tribute to Giles, reflecting on his contributions to severe weather forecasting and the culture of northeastern Oklahoma. Among those who paid tribute to Giles were personalities on competing stations such as KTUL and KJRH, as well as past and present colleagues at KOTV.

The Giles Coats for Kids program continues, with thousands of coats being donated each year.
Giles' wife, Hannah, continues to maintain the partnership her late husband founded with Bennett Steel, Inc. to sell Jim Giles Safe Rooms, which are designed to withstand an F5 tornado. On December 31, 2014, the company closed its doors, citing an "increasingly competitive market".

In 2007, Giles was posthumously inducted to the Oklahoma Association of Broadcasters Hall of Fame. In the same year, the University of Oklahoma (where he received a master's degree) named a classroom after Giles.  Also in 2007, a small park area on Rhema Bible Church's property was dedicated to him.

References

External links
Obituary at Legacy.com

1939 births
2006 deaths
American television meteorologists
Television personalities from Tulsa, Oklahoma
United States Air Force officers
United States Air Force personnel of the Vietnam War